Wewak Urban LLG is a local-level government (LLG) of East Sepik Province, Papua New Guinea.

Wards 13 name list 
83. Wewak Town

References

Local-level governments of East Sepik Province